‌The 2017 Asian Club League Handball Championship was the 20th edition of the championship held under the aegis of Asian Handball Federation. The championship was hosted by Handball Federation of India at the Kotla Vijay Bhaskar Reddy Indoor Stadium, Hyderabad (India) from 20 to 30 November 2017. It was the official competition for men's handball clubs of Asia crowning the Asian champions. Al-Najma Club (Bahrain) wins the championship by beating Al-Duhail Club (Qatar) by 21 – 16 in a low scoring match. The winner qualifies for the 2018 IHF Super Globe.

Draw
The draw ceremony took place on 7 October 2017 at the Hotel Marigold, Begumpet, Hyderabad (India) at 14:00 (UTC+05:30).

The ceremony was attended by the Asian Handball Federation's Executive Director Dr. Ahmed Abu Al-Lail, AHF Technical Manager Mr. Jasem M. Al-Theyab, Secretary General of Handball Federation of India Mr. Anandeshwar Pandey and the representatives of the participating clubs. The draw results are as follows:

 Al-Noor Club of Saudi Arabia withdrew from the championship a few days before the start, stating that their main key players were injured during preparation for the championship.

Group A

Group B

5th–8th Placement Matches

7th–8th-place match

5th–6th-place match

Semifinal matches

Bronze-medal match

Gold-medal match

Final standings

References

External links
 asianhandball.com
 Asian handball Champions League - goalzz.com

Handball competitions in Asia
Asian Handball Championships
Asian Men's Club League Handball Championship, 2017
Asia
International handball competitions hosted by India